The Leonard Schultze River or Leonhard Schultze River is a river in northern Papua New Guinea. It is named after German explorer Leonhard Schultze-Jena.

See also
List of rivers of Papua New Guinea
Leonard Schultze languages

References

Rivers of Papua New Guinea